Aimi Nouchi (born 14 January 1996) is a Japanese judoka.

She is the gold medallist of the 2016 Judo Grand Slam Tyumen in the -63 kg category.

References

External links
 

1996 births
Living people
japanese female judoka
21st-century Japanese women